Johannes Jensen may refer to:

 Johannes V. Jensen (1873–1950), Danish author
 J. Hans D. Jensen (1907–1973), German nuclear physicist
 Johannes Jensen (aviator) (1898–1978), German World War I flying ace
 Johannes Robert Jensen (1916–1984), Danish field hockey player